The Latécoère 611 was a French four-engined maritime reconnaissance flying boat of the Second World War. Although only a single prototype was completed, this served throughout the war, being used by both the Vichy French and Free French navies.

Development and design
In May 1935, the French Navy issued a specification for a long-range flying boat to replace the obsolete Breguet 521. To meet this requirement, Latécoère designed the Latécoère 611. This was a cantilever monoplane powered by four Gnome-Rhone 14N radial engines and fitted with a twin tail. It was also fitted with stabilising floats that retracted into the outer engine nacelles. The prototype was assembled at Biscarrosse, and first flew on 8 March 1939.

Although it was intended that the aircraft be armed with a 25 mm cannon in a dorsal turret, this was unavailable, and was replaced by one carrying two 7.5 mm Darne machine guns, with a further four machine guns firing through portholes and two in a retractable tail position. In December 1939 the French Navy placed an order for twelve of a modified version, the Latécoère 612, which was to be powered by four Pratt & Whitney R-1830 radial engines. These aircraft, however, were never delivered.

Operational history
The prototype Latécoère 611 was delivered to the French Navy on 12 April 1940 and named Achenar, being flown to North Africa in June 1940 and subsequently disarmed under the terms of the Armistice. After being damaged in a collision with another flying boat, it eventually entered full service with the Vichy French Navy on 15 October 1941, operating with Escadrille 4E at Port Lyautey and Dakar.

In November 1942, following the Allied Invasion of North Africa, Escadrille 4E switched sides and joined the Free French, carrying out anti-submarine patrols over the South Atlantic, later (October 1943) being enlarged to form Flotille 7F, which continued to fly the Latécoère 611 alongside Short Sunderlands. The Latécoère was re-armed in 1944, with the dorsal turret being fitted with two 50 cal. Browning machine guns and a similar gun being fitted in the tail.

The sole Latécoère 611 was finally retired from service as a transport in 1947.

Variants
Latécoère 610
Design studies for a military flying boat to have been powered by 4x  Hispano-Suiza 14AA-02 / Hispano-Suiza 14AA-03 engines, (left and right handed rotation).
Latécoère 611 
Prototype – powered by four Gnome-Rhône 14N-30 / Gnome-Rhône 14N-31 engines, (left and right handed rotation), given the name Achernar. One built.
Latécoère 612
Proposed production version – powered by four Pratt & Whitney R-1830 engines, (twelve ordered but unbuilt).

Operators
 
French Navy

Specifications (Latécoère 611)

See also

References

Bibliography

External links
aviafrance.com

1930s French military reconnaissance aircraft
Flying boats
Four-engined tractor aircraft
High-wing aircraft
Aircraft first flown in 1939
Four-engined piston aircraft